The Breckenridge station of Breckenridge, Minnesota was built in 1901, serving the Great Northern Railway and successor Burlington Northern until 1971.  Thereafter, passenger service continued under Amtrak, but with only a single route through Breckenridge, the Empire Builder.  After the North Coast Hiawatha, which ran on the former Northern Pacific Railway line from Minneapolis to Fargo, ended service in 1979, the Empire Builder moved to that corridor.

References

External links
Breckenridge, Minnesota – TrainWeb

Former Amtrak stations in Minnesota
Former Great Northern Railway (U.S.) stations
1901 establishments in Minnesota
Railway stations in the United States opened in 1901
Railway stations closed in 1979
1979 disestablishments in Minnesota